Center for Internet and Society may refer to:

 Berkman Center for Internet and Society, at Harvard University, US
 Stanford Center for Internet and Society, at Stanford Law School, US
 Centre for Internet and Society (India), in Bangalore, India